Philip Kirkham "P.K." Allen (born January 3, 1910, in Walpole, Massachusetts, died March 1, 1996, in Westwood, Massachusetts
) was an American educator and politician who represented the 4th Essex District in the Massachusetts Senate from 1947 to 1949 and served as Chairman of the Massachusetts Republican State Committee from 1961 to 1963.

Early life
Allen was born and raised in Walpole, Massachusetts. He attended Walpole public schools, Phillips Academy (Class of 1929), and Yale University (Class of 1933).

Teaching
After graduating from Yale, Allen coached and taught English at The Cambridge School of Weston. In 1936 he joined the faculty of Phillips Academy as a teacher, coach and assistant registrar.

Politics
Allen was elected to the Massachusetts Senate in 1946. He lost his 1948 reelection bid to Democrat John W. Coddaire Jr.

In 1951 Allen was named executive secretary of the Republican State Committee. From 1953 to 1955 he was the chief clerk of the United States Senate Committee on Armed Services. From 1955 to 1957 he was the executive assistant to Frederick A. Seaton, the Assistant Secretary of Defense for Legislative and Public Affairs.

Allen returned to Massachusetts in 1957 as the assistant general manager for finance at WGBH-TV and WGBH radio.

On March 11, 1961, Allen was elected Chairman of the Republican State Committee. He resigned this position in April 1963 due to personal and business reasons.

Later life
Allen died on March 1, 1996, in Westwood, Massachusetts.

See also
 1947–1948 Massachusetts legislature

References

1910 births
1996 deaths
Yale University alumni
Massachusetts Republican Party chairs
People from Walpole, Massachusetts
People from Andover, Massachusetts
Republican Party Massachusetts state senators
20th-century American politicians